Xinhua Township is a township of western Qianjiang District in southeastern Chongqing Municipality, People's Republic of China, located near the border with Pengshui County to the west and about  southwest of the district seat and  east-southeast of downtown Chongqing as the crow flies. , it has seven villages under its administration.

References 

Townships of Chongqing